The Picayune Item is a five-day daily newspaper published in Picayune, Mississippi, United States, covering Pearl River County and parts of Hancock County, Mississippi. It publishes in the evening, Tuesday through Friday, and on Sunday mornings. It is owned by Boone Newspapers, who purchased it from Community Newspaper Holdings in 2013.

References

External links

 Picayune Item Website

Newspapers published in Mississippi
Pearl River County, Mississippi